Restriction, restrict or restrictor may refer to:

Science and technology
 restrict, a keyword in the C programming language used in pointer declarations
 Restriction enzyme, a type of enzyme that cleaves genetic material

Mathematics and logic
 Restriction, a term in medieval supposition theory
 Restriction (mathematics), an aspect of a mathematical function
 Inflation-restriction exact sequence in mathematics

Other uses
 Censorship
 Restrictor (linguistics), a word or morpheme that specifies the meaning of a quantifier; see Polarity item

See also
 
 Restricted (disambiguation)